Leptinillus validus, the beaver nest beetle, is a species of round fungus beetle in the family Leiodidae. It is found in North America.

References

 Majka C, Langor D (2008). "The Leiodidae (Coleoptera) of Atlantic Canada: new records, faunal composition, and zoogeography". ZooKeys 2: 357–402.
 Peck, Stewart B. (2007). "Distribution and biology of the ectoparasitic beetles Leptinillus validus (Horn) and L. aplodontiae Ferris of North America (Coleoptera: Leiodidae: Platypsyllinae)". Insecta Mundi, no. 0003, 1–7.
 Peck, Stewart B. / Arnett, Ross H. Jr. and Michael C. Thomas, eds. (2001). "Family 19. Leiodidae Fleming, 1821". American Beetles, vol. 1: Archostemata, Myxophaga, Adephaga, Polyphaga: Staphyliniformia, 250–258.

Further reading

 Arnett, R. H. Jr., M. C. Thomas, P. E. Skelley and J. H. Frank. (eds.). (21 June 2002). American Beetles, Volume II: Polyphaga: Scarabaeoidea through Curculionoidea. CRC Press LLC, Boca Raton, Florida .
 
 Richard E. White. (1983). Peterson Field Guides: Beetles. Houghton Mifflin Company.

External links

 NCBI Taxonomy Browser, Leptinillus validus

Leiodidae
Beetles described in 1872